Rent Money may refer to:

 "Rent Money" (The Knights of Prosperity), an episode of The Knights of Prosperity
 "Rent Money" (Bodger & Badger), an episode of Bodger & Badger
 "Rent Money", a song by Future form the album Future
 "Rent Money", a song by Young Trimm featuring The-Dream; see The-Dream discography
 "Rent Money", a song by Mary J. Blige featuring Dave East from the album Good Morning Gorgeous

See also 
 Pay the Rent (disambiguation)